Legalism, or Fajia, is one of the  six classical schools of thought in Chinese philosophy. Literally meaning "house of (administrative) methods / standards (法, Fa)", the Fa "school" represents several branches of "men of methods", in the west often termed "realist" statesmen, who played foundational roles in the construction of the bureaucratic Chinese empire. The earliest persona of the Fajia may be considered Guan Zhong (720–645 BC), but following the precedent of the Han Feizi (c. 240 BC), Warring States period figures Shen Buhai (400–337 BC) and Shang Yang (390–338 BC) have commonly been taken as its "founders."

Commonly thought of as the "greatest" of the "Fajia's" texts, the Han Feizi is believed to contain the first commentaries on the Dao De Jing in history. Sun Tzu's The Art of War incorporates both a Daoist philosophy of inaction and impartiality, and a "Legalist" system of punishment and rewards, recalling Han Fei's use of the concepts of power (勢, shì) and tactics (術, shù). Temporarily coming to overt power as an ideology with the ascension of the Qin dynasty, the First Emperor of Qin and succeeding emperors often followed the template set by Han Fei.

Though the origins of the Chinese administrative system cannot be traced to any one person, the administrator Shen Buhai may have had more influence than any other on the construction of the merit system, and might be considered its founder, if not valuable as a rare pre-modern example of abstract theory of administration. Sinologist Herrlee G. Creel sees in Shen Buhai the "seeds of the civil service examination", and perhaps the first political scientist.

Concerned largely with administrative and sociopolitical innovation, Shang Yang was a leading reformer of his time. His numerous reforms transformed the peripheral Qin state into a militarily powerful and strongly centralized kingdom. Much of "Legalism" was "the development of certain ideas" that lay behind his reforms, which would help lead to Qin's ultimate conquest of the other states of China in 221 BC.

Calling them the "theorists of the state", sinologist Jacques Gernet considered the Fajia to be the most important intellectual tradition of the fourth and third centuries BC. The Fajia pioneered the centralizing measures and the economic organization of the population by the state that characterized the entire period from the Qin to the Tang dynasty; the Han dynasty took over and left the governmental institutions of the Qin dynasty almost unchanged.

Taken as "progressive," the Fajia were "rehabilitated" in the twentieth century, with reformers regarding it as a precedent for their opposition to conservative Confucian forces and religion. 
Many influential Chinese people in governments, including modern leaders Mao Zedong and Xi Jinping have considered themselves successors to Legalism over a span of thousands of years.  As a student, Mao Zedong championed Shang Yang, and towards the end of his life hailed the anti-Confucian legalist policies of the Qin dynasty.

Historical background

The Zhou dynasty was divided between the masses and the hereditary noblemen. The latter were placed to obtain office and political power, owing allegiance to the local prince, who owed allegiance to the Son of Heaven. The dynasty operated according to the principles of Li and punishment. The former was applied only to aristocrats, the latter only to commoners.

The earliest Zhou kings kept a firm personal hand on the government, depending on their personal capacities, personal relations between ruler and minister, and upon military might. The technique of centralized government being so little developed, they deputed authority to feudal lords. When the Zhou kings could no longer grant new fiefs, their power began to decline, vassals began to identify with their own regions, and schismatic hostility occurred between the Chinese states. Aristocratic families became very important, by virtue of their ancestral prestige wielding great power and proving a divisive force.

In the Spring and Autumn period (771–476 BC), rulers began to directly appoint state officials to provide advice and management, leading to the decline of inherited privileges and bringing fundamental structural transformations as a result of what may be termed "social engineering from above". Most Warring States period thinkers tried to accommodate a "changing with the times" paradigm, and each of the schools of thought sought to provide an answer for the attainment of sociopolitical stability.

Confucianism, commonly considered to be China's ruling ethos, was articulated in opposition to the establishment of legal codes, the earliest of which were inscribed on bronze vessels in the sixth century BC. For the Confucians, the Classics provided the preconditions for knowledge. Orthodox Confucians tended to consider organizational details beneath both minister and ruler, leaving such matters to underlings, and furthermore wanted ministers to control or at least admonish the ruler.

Concerned with "goodness", the Confucians became the most prominent, followed by the proto-Taoists and the administrative thought that Sima Tan termed the Fajia. But the Taoists focused on the development of inner powers, and both the Taoists and Confucians held a regressive view of history, the age being a decline from the era of the Zhou kings.

Introduction

In the four centuries preceding the first empire, a new type of ruler emerged intent on breaking the power of the aristocrats and reforming their state's bureaucracies. As disenfranchised or opportunist aristocrats were increasingly attracted by the reform-oriented rulers, they brought with them philosophy concerned foremost with organizational methodology. Described by Julia Ching as "essentially a response to the problem of finding order" during the disintegration of the Zhou feudal society, successful reforms made the so-called "Fajia" significant, promoting the rapid growth of the Qin state that applied reforms most thoroughly.

Ruler-centered administrative focus
Though the syncretic Han Feizi speaks on what may have been termed law by earlier scholars, the Fajia themselves were concerned mainly with administration, such that continuing to mistranslate Fa as Law would mislead readers as to their theories. Even the more "Legalistic" Book of Lord Shang still engages statutes more from an administrative standpoint, as well as addressing many other administrative questions.

The Fajia has implications for the work of judges, but "contains no explicit judicial theory", and is motivated "almost totally from the ruler's point of view". Though Han Fei espoused that his model state would increase the quality of life, he did not consider this a legitimizing factor (rather, a side-effect of good order). He focused on the functioning of the state, the ruler's role as guarantor within it, and aimed in particular at making the state strong and the ruler the strongest person within it. To this end, Shen Buhai and successor Han Fei are concerned in particular with "the role of the ruler and the means by which he may control a bureaucracy."

The goal of the "Legalist" ruler was conquest and unification of all under heaven (or in the case of Shen Buhai at least defense), and the writings of Han Fei and other Fajia are almost purely practical, eschewing ethics in favour of strategy teaching the ruler techniques (shu) to survive in a competitive world through administrative reform: strengthening the central government, increasing food production, enforcing military training, or replacing the aristocracy with a bureaucracy. Han Fei's prince must make use of Fa (administrative methods and standards), surround himself with an aura of wei (majesty) and shi (authority, power, influence), and make use of the art (shu) of statecraft. The ruler who follows Tao moves away from benevolence and righteousness, and discards reason and ability, subduing the people through Fa (statutes or administrative methods but implying objective measurements). Only an absolute ruler can restore the world.

Anti-ministerialism and human nature
The authority to make policy is a basic difference between Confucianism and the Fajia. Proposing a return to feudal ideals, albeit his nobleman being anyone who possessed virtue, Confucians granted authority to "wise and virtuous ministers", allowed to "govern as they saw fit". In contrast, Shen Buhai and Shang Yang monopolized policy in the hands of the ruler, and Qin administrative documents focused on rigorous control of local officials, and the keeping of written records. Distinguished by their anti-ministerial stance, the Fajia rejected their Confucian contemporaries' espousal of a regime based solely on the charisma of the aristocrats, and much of Fajia's doctrines seek self-regulating and mechanically reliable, if not foolproof means to control or otherwise dispense with officials administering the state. Reducing the human element, the first of these is the universally applicable Fa (administrative methods and standards).

Han (state) figures Shen Buhai and later Han Fei considered the ruler to be in a situation of constant danger from his aides, and the target of Han Fei's Fa is not the people, but the scholarly bureaucracy and ambitious advisers – the Confucians, who go on to paint themselves as standing against a "systematic, and brutal reign of terror" against the people. Saying that "superior and inferior fight a hundred battles a day", long sections of the Han Feizi provide example of how ministers undermined various rulers, and focus on how the ruler can protect himself against treacherous ministers, strongly emphasizing their mutually different interests.

Though not exceptional, Sinologist Yuri Pines considers this selfish view of human nature to be a pillar of the Fajia, and a number of chapters of the Book of Lord Shang consider men naturally evil. The Fajia are therefore distinct from the Confucians in dismissing the possibility of reforming the elite, that being the ruler and ministers, or driving them by moral commitment. Every member of the elite pursues his own interests. Preserving and strengthening the ruler's authority against these may be considered the Fajia's "singularly pronounced political commitment". On rare occasions, Han Fei lauds such qualities as benevolence and proper social norms; with due consideration for the times they were living in however, the Fajia did not believe that the moral influence or virtue of the ruler was powerful enough to create order.

Considering the power struggle between ruler and minister irreconcilable, and focusing on the prevention of evil rather than the promotion of good, the Fajia largely rejected the utility of both virtue and the Confucian rule of man, insisting on impersonal norms and regulations in their relations. Their approach was therefore primarily at the institutional level, aiming for a clear power structure, consistently enforced rules and regulations, and in the Han Feizi, engaging in sophisticated manipulation tactics to enhance power bases.

Rather than aristocratic fiefs, Qin territory came under the direct control of the Qin rulers, directly appointing officials on the basis of their qualifications. With the state of Qin conquering all the Warring States and founding the "first" Chinese empire in 221 BC, the Fajia had succeeded in propelling state centralization and laying the foundations of Chinese bureaucracy, establishing "efficient and effective" codes that "became the pattern for Chinese politics for the next two millennia". The philosophies of the reformers fell with the Qin, but tendencies remained in the supposedly Confucian imperial government, and the Han Feizi would be studied by rulers in every dynasty. Hui even asserts that Confucianism's role in Chinese history is "[no] more than cosmetic", and Legalism is a more accurate description of the Chinese governmental tradition.

Atheistic orientation

Legalism has been widely seen as a homogeneous anti-religious and authoritarian stream of thought. Julia Ching believed it was "utterly devoid of any religious belief, moral sense, or sensitivity to nature", and made the case that the ideal Chinese sage-king was seen as someone who should operate without excessive mysticism or bias favoring any one spiritual tradition by many political factions over thousands of years, explaining the problems various religions have faced in or because of dynastic courts.

Legalist writings rarely mentioned a divine or supernatural power, but Sor-Hoon Tan, a scholar who generally agreed with Ching's ideas, has mentioned that some Legalists have discussed Heaven and tried to be religious innovators. Legalist-Taoist syncretism has occurred, and a belief in Legalism that was quite influential was salvation if one followed or executed laws correctly.

Antecedents: Guan Zhong and Mozi

Robert Eno of Indiana University writes that "If one were to trace the origins of Legalism as far back as possible, it might be appropriate to date its beginnings to the prime ministership of Guan Zhong (720–645 BC)", who "may be seen as the source of the notion that good government involved skilled systems design". The reforms of Guan Zhong applied levies and economic specializations at the village level instead of the aristocracy, and shifted administrative responsibility to professional bureaucrats. He valued education.

Guan Zhong and later Mozi (470-391BC) recommended objective, reliable, easily used, publicly accessible standards, or models, called Fa, whose adherents would come to oppose what Sinologist Chad Hansen terms the "cultivated intuition of self-admiration societies", expert at chanting old texts. However, although the Confucians generally opposed Fa as "authoritarian", for the early Guan Zhong, and Qin-era Confucian apologist Xun Kuang, Fa could complement any traditional scheme, and both use Fa alongside the more valued metaphysical Confucian Li (the unique principles or standards of things, being their determinant and differentiating them) without considering Fa as "an alternative form of social control."

What Fa made possible was the accurate following of instructions. With minimal training, anyone can use Fa to perform a task or check results. In principle, if their roots in Guan Zhong and Mozi are considered, the Fajia would all appear to use Fa in the same (administrative) fashion.

The Mohists advocated a unified, utilitarian ethical and political order, positing some of its first theories and initiating a philosophical debate in China. To unify moral standards, they supported a "centralized, authoritarian state led by a virtuous, benevolent sovereign, managed by a hierarchical, merit-based bureaucracy". That social order is paramount seems to be implicit, recognized by all. They argued against nepotism, and, as with the later Fa "philosophers", for universal standards (or meritocracy) as represented by the centralized state, saying "If one has ability, then he is promoted. If he has no ability, then he is demoted. Promoting public justice and casting away private resentments – this is the meaning of such statements."

Compared by Sinologist Chris Fraser with Plato, the hermeneutics of the Mohists contained the philosophical germs of what Sima-Tan would term the "Fa-School", contributing to the political thought of contemporary reformers. The Mohists and the Guanzi text attributed to Guan Zhong are of particular importance to understanding Fa, meaning "to model on" or "to emulate". Dan Robins of the University of Hong Kong considers Fa to have become "important in early Chinese philosophy largely because of the Mohists.

Of particular concern for the Fajia and the Mohists, the fourth century witnessed the emergence of discussions polarizing the concepts of self and private, commonly used in conjunction with profit and associated with fragmentation, division, partiality, and one-sidelines, with that of the state and "public", represented by the duke and referring to what is official or royal, that is, the ruler himself, associated with unity, wholeness, objectivity, and universality. The latter denotes the "Universal Way". Legalism and Mohism are distinguished by this effort to obtain objectivity.

Mohist hermeneutics vs Confucian Li or western law
Mohism or the thought of the Fajia is not based on entities, transcendentals or universals, but parts or roles ("names"), and are therefore relatable to the Confucian rectification of names, which arguably originates in Mozi's development of Fa. For the most part Confucianism does not elaborate on Fa (though Han Confucians embraced Fa as an essential element in administration), though the idea of norms themselves being older, Fa is theoretically derived from the Confucian Li. However, the "core assumption" of Confucianism in rectifying names was that the ruler was supposed to use innate or developed intuition to "settle correct language use".

Rejecting the Confucian idea of parents as a moral model as particular and unreliable, the driving idea of the Mohists was the use of hermeneutics to find objective models/standards (Fa) for ethics and politics, as was done in any practical field, to order or govern society. These were primarily practical rather than principles or rules, as in the square and plumb-line. The Mohists used Fa as "objective, particularly operational or measurement-like standards for fixing the referents of names", or "determining the application of terminology", hoping that analysis of language standards (Fa) would yield some objective way (dao) of moral reform. For Mozi, if language is made objective, then language itself could serve as a source of information and argued that in any dispute of distinctions, one party must be right and one wrong.

In contrast to a more western understanding of law, with penal law in particular backed by punishment, while other terms might denote mere command, the essential characteristic of Fa is measurement, and even the Confucian Xun Kuang distinguished the concept Fa from regulations and punishment in his usage. Rather, Mozi considered the elucidation of different "types" or "classes" to be the basis of both cognitive thinking and sociopolitical practice. Referring to an easily projectable standard of utility, the Mohists explain "Fa" as compasses or circles, and may be prototypes, exemplars, or (specific) analogies.

Fa is never merely arbitrary or the ruler's desire, nor does it aim at an intellectual grasp of a definition or principle, but the practical ability to perform a task (dao) successfully, or to "do something correctly in practice" — and in particular, to be able to distinguish various kinds of things from one another. Measuring to determine whether distinctions have been properly drawn, Fa compares something against itself, and judges whether the two are similar, just as with the use of the compass or the L-square. What matches the standard is then the particular object, and thus correct. This constituted the basic conception of Mohist's practical reasoning and knowledge.

Mozi said,

Administrative method (fa)
Despite the framing of Han historians, the Fajia did not seem to think they were using Fa differently than anyone else. The closest that Han Fei comes to standard laws would be Fa-ling, or "interpretive standards with commands", without apparent prescription for universality; this along with other terms, including interpretive-standard criteria (fa-du), interpretive-standard methods (fa-shu), and interpretive-standard morality (fa-i).

Sinology Chad Hansen explains the ancient Chinese as acting on a variety of "rival social codes" requiring interpretation. The ancient Chinese focus was largely on terminology. Neither ancient Chinese moral or political philosophy use notions of individual rules, duties, obligations, legal rights, or conceptions of belief, desire, raison d'etre, or retribution presupposing freedom, moral and rational agency and responsibility, any of which would be essential to the modern western concept of law. Rather, it would be the Qin Empire under Li Si that would institute Lu, or (the ancient Chinese conception of) laws, a new term for a new, universal institution, rarely used in older texts.

The influence of the Mohists on the Fajia thus is likely strong. Though Masayuki Sato translates Fa as law, he explains the concept as more like an objective measuring device. Sinologist Mark Edward Lewis writes: language, such as that of a legal code, is linked to social control. If words are not correct, they do not correspond to reality, and regulation fails. "Law" is "purified", rectified, or technically regulated language. For Shen Buhai, correct or perverse words will order or ruin the state.

Han Fei credits Shang Yang with the practice of Fa, not law, in statecraft. Shang Yang's systematic application of penalties increase the tendency to see it as penal, but arguably does not change meaning from that of the Mohists. Shang Yang's innovation was not penal law. Rather, Shang Yang's idea was that penal codes should be reformed to have the same kind of objectivity, clarity and accessibility as the craft-linked instruments. Shang Yang and Han Fei intended their "codes" be "self-interpreting" (Hansen).

The Fajia do not contrast "penal law" with the Confucian Li, which may be described as elite, ancient, traditionalist, intuitive-moral, ritualistic. Rather, Shang Yang and Han Fei contrast the Confucian Li, and the "authority of traditional content" (Hansen), with the "publicity, objectivity and accessibility" of Fa, measurement standards, and their aim of maximizing the wealth and strength of the ruler and state. Contrasting Fa with private distortions and behavior, theoretically, their Fa exactly follows Mozi.

Shang Yang was supposedly taught by a Confucian syncretist, Shi Jiao, who, stressing the importance of "name" (rectification of names), connected it with reward and punishment. Applied to economy and institution, Shang Yang's Fa is total and anti-bureaucratic, calculating rank mathematically from the adherence to standards (Fa) in the performance of roles (models), namely that of soldiers and (to a lesser extent) farmers. Han Fei shows no revolutionary insight into rules; objectively-determined "models" (Fa) or "names" (titles/roles), being measured against, replace intuitive guidance, especially that of the ruler. It is these that enable control of a bureaucracy. Carine Defoort of New York University explains:

Because Fa is necessary for articulating administrative terms, it is presupposed in any application of punishment, and Han Fei stressed measurement-like links between rewards and punishments and performance. Applied through incentives and disincentives, Fa provided guidance for behavior, the performance of civil and military roles, and advancement.

An excavated Qin text consists of twenty-five abstract model patterns guiding procedure based on actual situations.

Branches of the Fajia

Feng Youlan and Liang Qichao describe the elements of the Fajia as Fa, authority or power (Shi), and "technique" (Shu), that is, statecraft or "the art of conducting affairs and handling men". Less well defined compared to Confucianism and Mohism, it is unclear when the Fajia came to be regarded as an intellectual faction, only forming a complex of ideas around the time of Li Si (280–208 BC), elder advisor to the First Emperor. While the earliest Legalistic act can be traced to Zichan (and with him Deng Xi), Chinese scholar K. C. Hsiao and Sinologist Herrlee G. Creel followed the Han Feizi in considering the Fajia to have stemmed from two disparate contemporary thinkers:

In contrast to the old feudalism, Shang or Gongsun Yang considered there to be no single model of rule in the past, and everything changeable as a product of changing conditions; holding decline to have resulted from a scarcity of resources, he prescribed statecraft. Questioning traditional rule and the relevance of the past to the present, the first chapter of the Book of Lord Shang cites Gongsun as saying: "Orderly generations did not [follow] a single way; to benefit the state, one need not imitate antiquity." Distinguished by his heavy emphasis on penalty and mutual responsibility (among both minister and population), he instituted severe punishment for the Qin (later reduced).

Gongsun ultimately did not believe that the method of rule really mattered as long as the state was rich, and tried to dispense with the selection of exceptional men through insurance mechanisms while attacking moral discussion as empowering ministers. His anti-bureaucracy may be seen as a precursor to that of Han Fei, and together with their predecessor Mozi may be characterized as following a philosophical tradition of "objective, public, accessible standards" (Fa). The Shang Yang school was favored, though not exclusively, by Emperor Wu of Han. In contrast to Shang Yang, though seeking at the motivation of his subjects, Han Fei is much more skeptical of self-interest.

By contrast, Shen Buhai espouses there to be one method of rule alone, and his Shu branch sometimes even opposed punishments, being untenable in a situation requiring persuasion given danger, impotence, or disadvantage. Han Fei syncretized the branches under his own philosophy. This combination is commonly known as the Fajia. Because, historically, the branches did not endorse each other's views, Creel often called the Shen Buhai group "administrators", "methodists" or "technocrats", a division nominally accepted by the Cambridge History of China. Han Fei called both branches "the instruments of Kings and Emperors", and Li Si praised them equally, finding no contradiction between them.

Sinologist Chad Hansen describes their difference as such: "Shen Buhai's shu ('techniques') limit the ministers' influence on the ruler; Shang Yang's fa controls their power over the people."

The scholar Shen Dao (350 – c. 275 BC) covered a "remarkable" quantity of Legalist and Taoistic themes. Incorporated into the Han Feizi and The Art of War, he nonetheless lacked a recognizable group of followers.

Shang Yang (390–338 BC)

Hailing from Wei, as Prime Minister of the State of Qin Shang Yang or Gongsun Yang engaged in a "comprehensive plan to eliminate the hereditary aristocracy". Drawing boundaries between private factions and the central, royal state, he took up the cause of meritocratic appointment, stating "Favoring one's relatives is tantamount to using self-interest as one's way, whereas that which is equal and just prevents selfishness from proceeding."

As the first of his accomplishments, historiographer Sima Qian accounts Gongsun as having divided the populace into groups of five and ten, instituting a system of mutual responsibility tying status entirely to service to the state. It rewarded office and rank for martial exploits, going as far as to organize women's militias for siege defense. The second accomplishment listed is forcing the populace to attend solely to agriculture (or women cloth production, including a possible sewing draft) and recruiting labour from other states. He abolished the old fixed landholding system (Fengjian) and direct primogeniture, making it possible for the people to buy and sell (usufruct) farmland, thereby encouraging the peasants of other states to come to Qin. The recommendation that farmers be allowed to buy office with grain was apparently only implemented much later, the first clear-cut instance in 243 BC. Infanticide was prohibited.

Gongsun deliberately produced equality of conditions amongst the ruled, a tight control of the economy, and encouraged total loyalty to the state, including censorship and reward for denunciation. Law was what the sovereign commanded, and this meant absolutism, but it was an absolutism of law as impartial and impersonal. Gongsun discouraged arbitrary tyranny or terror as destroying the law. Emphasizing knowledge of the Fa among the people, he proposed an elaborate system for its distribution to allow them to hold ministers to it. He considered it the most important device for upholding the power of the state. Insisting that it be made known and applied equally to all, he posted it on pillars erected in the new capital. In 350, along with the creation of the new capital, a portion of Qin was divided into thirty-one counties, each "administered by a (presumably centrally appointed) magistrate". This was a "significant move toward centralizing Ch'in administrative power" and correspondingly reduced the power of hereditary landholders.

Gongsun considered the sovereign to be a culmination in historical evolution, representing the interests of state, subject and stability. Objectivity was a primary goal for him, wanting to be rid as much as possible of the subjective element in public affairs. The greatest good was order. History meant that feeling was now replaced by rational thought, and private considerations by public, accompanied by properties, prohibitions and restraints. In order to have prohibitions, it is necessary to have executioners, hence officials, and a supreme ruler. Virtuous men are replaced by qualified officials, objectively measured by Fa. The ruler should rely neither on his nor his officials' deliberations, but on the clarification of Fa. Everything should be done by Fa, whose transparent system of standards will prevent any opportunities for corruption or abuse. Shang Yang also corrected measures and weights.

Anti-Confucianism
While Shen Buhai and Shen Dao's current may not have been hostile to Confucius, Shang Yang and Han Fei emphasize their rejection of past models as unverifiable if not useless ("what was appropriate for the early kings is not appropriate for modern rulers"). In the west, past scholars have argued that Shang Yang sought to establish the supremacy of what some have termed positive law at the expense of customary or "natural" law. Han Fei argued that the age of Li had given way to the age of Fa, with natural order giving way to social order and finally political order. Together with that of Xun Kuang, their sense of human progress and reason guided the Qin dynasty.

Intending his Dao (way of government) to be both objective and publicly projectable, Han Fei argued that disastrous results would occur if the ruler acted on arbitrary, ad-hoc decision making, such as that based on relationships or morality which, as a product of reason, are "particular and fallible". Li, or Confucian customs, and rule by example are also simply too ineffective. The ruler cannot act on a case-by-case basis, and so must establish an overarching system, acting through Fa (administrative methods or standards). Fa is not partial to the noble, does not exclude ministers, and does not discriminate against the common people.

Linking the "public" sphere with justice and objective standards, for Han Fei, the private and public had always opposed each other. Taking after Shang Yang he lists the Confucians among his "five vermin", and calls the Confucian teaching on love and compassion for the people the "stupid teaching" and "muddle-headed chatter", the emphasis on benevolence an "aristocratic and elitist ideal" demanding that "all ordinary people of the time be like Confucius' disciples". Moreover, he dismisses it as impracticable, saying that "In their settled knowledge, the literati are removed from the affairs of the state ... What can the ruler gain from their settled knowledge?", and points out that "Confucianism" is not a unified body of thought.

Assessments
Keeping in mind the information of the time (1955) and the era of which he is speaking, A. F. P. Hulsewé goes as far as to call Shang Yang the "founder of the school of law", and considers his unification of punishments one of his most important contributions; that is, giving the penalty of death to any grade of person disobeying the king's orders. Shang Yang even expected the king, though the source of law (authorizing it), to follow it. This treatment is in contrast to ideas more typical of archaic society, more closely represented in the Rites of Zhou as giving different punishments to different strata of society.

Hulsewe points out that Sima Tan considered equal treatment the "school of law's" most salient point: "They do not distinguish between close and far relatives, nor do they disriminate between noble and humble, but in an uniform manner they decide on them in law." Though himself deriving them from elsewhere, the Han dynasty adopted essentially the same denominations of crimes, if not equality, as Shang Yang set down for Qin, without collective punishment of the three sets of relatives.

Shang Yang appeared to act according to his own teachings, and translator Duvendak references him as being considered "like a bamboo‑frame which keeps a bow straight, and one could not get him out of his straightness", even if spoken of by some pre-modern Chinese in ill regard with the fall of Qin. Though writing in 1928, Duvendak believed that Shang Yang should be of interest not just to Sinologists, but Western Jurists as well.

Shen Buhai (400 – c. 337 BC)

The basic structure and operation of the traditional Chinese state was not "legalistic" as the term is commonly understood. Though persisting, pre-modern mainstream Chinese thinking never really accepted the role of law and jurisprudence or the Shang Yang wing of the Fajia. The Fajia's most important contribution lies in the organization and regulation of centralized, bureaucratic government. Sinologist Herrlee G. Creel called its philosophy administrative for lack of a better term, considering it to have been founded by Shen Buhai (400–337 BC), who likely played an "outstanding role in the creation of the traditional Chinese system of government".

Shen was chancellor of Han for fifteen years (354–337 BC). The Huainanzi says that when Shen lived the officials of the state of Han were at cross-purposes and did not know what practices to follow; the legal system of Han was apparently confused, prohibiting uniform reward and punishment. It is not surprising then that no text identifies Shen Buhai with penal law. We have no basis to suppose that Shen advocated the doctrine of rewards and punishment (of Shang Yang, as Han Fei did), and Han Fei criticizes him for not unifying the laws.

A teacher of Legalist Li Kui, the Confucian Bu Shang is cited for the principle of favouring talents over favouritism, becoming under the Mohists the principle of "elevating the worthy and employing ability". Adhering thereto, Shen utilized the same category of method (Fa) as others of the Fajia, but emphasized its use in secrecy for purposes of investigation and personnel control, concerning himself with methods (Fa) of (impersonal bureaucratic) administration (namely methods of appointment and performance measurement) or the ruler's role in the control thereof. He is famous for the dictum "The Sage ruler relies on standards/method (Fa) and does not rely on wisdom; he relies on technique, not on persuasions."

What Shen appears to have realized is that the "methods for the control of a bureaucracy" could not be mixed with the survivals of feudal government, or staffed merely by "getting together a group of 'good men, but rather must be men qualified in their jobs. He therefore emphasizes the importance of selecting able officials as much as Confucius did, but insists on "constant vigilance over their performance", never mentioning virtue. Well aware of the possibility of the loss of the ruler's position, and thus state or life, from said officials, Shen says:

Compared with Shang Yang, Shen Buhai refers to the ruler in abstract terms: he is simply the head of a bureaucracy. In comparison with Han Fei though his system still required a strong ruler at the centre, emphasizing that he trust no one minister. Ideally, Shen Buhai's ruler had the widest possible sovereignty, was intelligent (if not a sage), had to make all crucial decisions himself, and had unlimited control of the bureaucracy. Shen largely recommended that rulers investigate their ministers' performance, checking his ministers' reports while remaining calm and secretive (Wu wei). The ruler promotes and demotes according to the match between 'performance' and proposal (Xing Ming).

Shen Buhai insisted that the ruler must be fully informed on the state of his realm, but could not afford to get caught up in details and in an ideal situation need listen to no one. Listening to his courtiers might interfere with promotions, and he does not, as Sinologist Herrlee G. Creel says, have the time to do so. The way to see and hear independently is the grouping together of particulars into categories using mechanical or operational method (Fa). On the contrary the ruler's eyes and hears will make him "deaf and blind" (unable to obtain accurate information). Seeing and hearing independently, the ruler is able to make decisions independently, and is, Shen says, able to rule the world thereby.

Shu or "Technique"

Apart from Shang Yang's doctrine of penalties and mutual spying and denouncement among ministers, Han Fei recommends the ruler should protect himself through careful employment of doctrines that had earlier been recommended by Shen Buhai. Because Fa has diverse meaning, for clarification Shen Buhai's successors often used the term Shu (technique) for his administrative method (Fa) and other techniques (such as "Wu-wei"), and thus 20th century philosopher Feng Youlan called Shen the leader of the group [in the Legalist school] emphasizing Shu, or techniques of government.

Liu Xiang wrote that Shen Buhai advised the ruler of men use technique (shu) rather than punishment, relying on persuasion to supervise and hold responsible, though very strictly. Shen's doctrines are described as concerned almost exclusively with the "ruler's role and the methods by which he may control a bureaucracy"; that is, its management and personnel control: the selection of capable ministers, their performance, the monopolization of power, and the control of and power relations between ruler and minister which he characterized as Wu Wei. The emphasis, however, is on "scrutinizing achievement and on that ground alone to give rewards, and to bestow office solely on the basis of ability". Sinologist John Makeham characterizes Shu as "the agency of several checking systems that together constituted Method (Fa)", whose central principle is accountability.

Sinologist Herrlee G. Creel believed the term originally had the sense of numbers, with implicit roots in statistical or categorizing methods, using record-keeping in financial management as a numerical measure of accomplishment. He notes that command of finance was generally held by the head of government from the beginning of the Zhou dynasty; an example of auditing dates to 800 BC, and the practice of annual accounting solidified by the Warring States period and budgeting by the first century BC.

In the Guanzi the artisan's Shu is explicitly compared to that of the good ruler. The History of the Han (Han Shu) lists texts for Shu as devoted to "calculation techniques" and "techniques of the mind", and describes the Warring States period as a time when the shu arose because the complete tao had disappeared. Hsu Kai (920–974 AD) calls Shu a branch in, or components of, the great Tao, likening it to the spokes on a wheel. He defines it as "that by which one regulates the world of things; the algorithms of movement and stillness". Mastery of techniques was a necessary element of sagehood.

Another example of Shu is Chuan-shu, or "political maneuvering". The concept of Ch'uan, or "weighing" figures in Legalist writings from very early times. It also figures in Confucian writings as at the heart of moral action, including in the Mencius and the Doctrine of the Mean. Weighing is contrasted with "the standard". Life and history often necessitate adjustments in human behavior, which must suit what is called for at a particular time. It always involves human judgement. A judge that has to rely on his subjective wisdom, in the form of judicious weighing, relies on Ch'uan. The Confucian Zhu Xi, who was notably not a restorationist, emphasized expedients as making up for incomplete standards or methods.

Name and reality (Ming-shi)

A contemporary of Confucius, the logician Deng Xi (died 501 BC) was cited by Liu Xiang for the origin of the principle of Xing-Ming. Serving as a minor official in the state of Zheng, he is reported to have drawn up a code of penal laws. Associated with litigation, he is said to have argued for the permissibility of contradictory propositions, likely engaging in hair-splitting debates on the interpretation of laws, legal principles and definitions.

Shen Buhai solves this through Wu wei, or not getting involved, making an official's words his own responsibility. Shen Buhai says, "The ruler controls the policy, the ministers manage affairs. To speak ten times and ten times be right, to act a hundred times and a hundred times succeed – this is the business of one who serves another as minister; it is the not the way to rule." The correlation between Wu-wei and ming-shi likely informed the Taoist conception of the formless Tao that "gives rise to the ten thousand things".

In the Han Dynasty secretaries of government who had charge of the records of decisions in criminal matters were called Xing-Ming, which Sima Qian (145 or 135 – 86 BC) and Liu Xiang (77–6 BC) attributed to the doctrine of Shen Buhai (400 – c. 337 BC). Liu Xiang goes as far as to define Shen Buhai's doctrine as Xing-Ming. Shen actually used an older, more philosophically common equivalent, ming-shi, linking the "Legalist doctrine of names" with the name and reality (ming shi) debates of the school of names – another school evolving out of the Mohists. Such discussions are also prominent in the Han Feizi, and the earliest literary occurrence for Xing-Ming, in the Zhan Guo Ce, is also in reference to the school of names.

Ming ("name") sometimes has the sense of speech – so as to compare the statements of an aspiring officer with the reality of his actions – or reputation, again compared with real conduct (xing "form" or shi "reality"). Two anecdotes by Han Fei provide examples: The Logician Ni Yue argued that a white horse is not a horse, and defeated all debaters, but was still tolled at the gate. In another, the chief minister of Yan pretended to see a white horse dash out the gate. All of his subordinates denied having seen anything, save one, who ran out after it and returned claiming to have seen it, and was thereby identified as a flatterer.

Shen Buhai's personnel control, or rectification of names (such as titles) worked thereby for "strict performance control" (Hansen) correlating claims, performances and posts. It would become a central tenant of both Legalist statecraft and its Huang-Lao derivatives. Rather than having to look for "good" men, ming-shi or xing-ming can seek the right man for a particular post, though doing so implies a total organizational knowledge of the regime. More simply though, it can allow ministers to "name" themselves through accounts of specific cost and time frame, leaving their definition to competing ministers. Claims or utterances "bind the speaker to the realization a job (Makeham)." This was the doctrine, with subtle differences, favoured by Han Fei. Favoring exactness, it combats the tendency to promise too much. The correct articulation of Ming is considered crucial to the realization of projects.

In Chinese Thought: An Introduction, S. Y. Hsieh suggests a set of assumptions underlying the concept of (xing-ming).
 That when a large group of people are living together, it is necessary to have some form of government.
 The government has to be responsible for a wide range of things, to allow them to live together peacefully.
 The government does not consist of one person only, but a group.
 One is a leader that issues orders to other members, namely officials, and assigns responsibilities to them.
 To do this, the leader must know the exact nature of the responsibilities, as well as the capabilities of the officials.
 Responsibilities, symbolized by a title, should correspond closely with capabilities, demonstrated by performance. 
 Correspondence measures success in solving problems and also controls the officials. When there is a match, the leader should award the officials.
 It is necessary to recruit from the whole population. Bureaucratic government marks the end of feudal government.

Wu wei (inaction)

Playing a "crucial role in the promotion of the autocratic tradition of the Chinese polity", what is termed Wu wei (or inaction) would become the political theory of the Fajia (or "Chinese Legalists"), if not becoming their general term for political strategy. The (qualified) non-action of the ruler ensures his power and the stability of the polity, and can therefore be considered his foremost technique. The "conception of the ruler's role as a supreme arbiter, who keeps the essential power firmly in his grasp" while leaving details to ministers, would have a "deep influence on the theory and practice of Chinese monarchy". Following Shen Buhai strongly advocated by Han Fei, during the Han dynasty up until the reign of Han Wudi rulers confined their activity "chiefly to the appointment and dismissal of his high officials", a plainly "Legalist" practice inherited from the Qin dynasty.

Lacking any metaphysical connotation, Shen used the term Wu wei to mean that the ruler, though vigilant, should not interfere with the duties of his ministers, acting through administrative method. Shen says: 

Though not a conclusive argument against proto-Taoist influence, Shen's Buhai's Taoist terms do not show evidence of explicit Taoist usage (Confucianism also uses terms like "Tao", or Wu wei), lacking any metaphysical connotation. The Han Feizi has a commentary on the Tao Te Ching, but references Shen Buhai rather than Laozi for Wu wei. Since the bulk of both the Tao Te Ching and the Zhuangzhi appear to have been composed later, Sinologist Herrlee G. Creel argued that it may therefore be assumed that Shen Buhai influenced them.

Shen Buhai argued that if the government were organized and supervised relying on proper method (Fa), the ruler need do little – and must do little. Unlike Legalists Shang Yang and Han Fei, Shen did not consider the relationship between ruler and minister antagonistic necessarily. Apparently paraphrasing the Analects, Shen Buhai's statement that those near him will feel affection, while the far will yearn for him, stands in contrast to Han Fei, who considered the relationship between the ruler and ministers irreconcilable.

However, Shen still believed that the ruler's most able ministers are his greatest danger, and is convinced that it is impossible to make them loyal without techniques. Creel explains: "The ruler's subjects are so numerous, and so on alert to discover his weaknesses and get the better of him, that it is hopeless for him alone as one man to try to learn their characteristics and control them by his knowledge ... the ruler must refrain from taking the initiative, and from making himself conspicuous – and therefore vulnerable – by taking any overt action."

Shen Buhai portrays the ruler as putting up a front to hide his dependence on his advisers. Aside from hiding the ruler's weaknesses, Shen's ruler, therefore, makes use of method (Fa) in secrecy. Even more than with Han Fei, Shen Buhai's ruler's strategies are a closely guarded secret, aiming for a complete independence that challenges "one of the oldest and most sacred tenets of [Confucianism]", that of respectfully receiving and following ministerial advice.

Though espousing an ultimate inactive end, the term does not appear in the Book of Lord Shang, ignoring it as an idea for control of the administration.

Yin (passive mindfulness)
Shen's ruler plays no active role in governmental functions. He should not use his talent even if he has it. Not using his own skills, he is better able to secure the services of capable functionaries. However, Sinologist Herrlee G. Creel also argues that not getting involved in details allowed Shen's ruler to "truly rule", because it leaves him free to supervise the government without interfering, maintaining his perspective.

Adherence to the use of technique in governing requires the ruler not engage in any interference or subjective consideration. Sinologist John Makeham explains: "assessing words and deeds requires the ruler's dispassionate attention; (yin is) the skill or technique of making one's mind a tabula rasa, non-committaly taking note of all the details of a man's claims and then objectively comparing his achievements of the original claims."

A commentary to the Shiji cites a now-lost book as quoting Shen Buhai saying: "By employing (yin), 'passive mindfulness', in overseeing and keeping account of his vassals, accountability is deeply engraved." The Guanzi similarly says: "Yin is the way of non-action. Yin is neither to add to nor to detract from anything. To give something a name strictly on the basis of its form – this is the Method of yin."

Yin also aimed at concealing the ruler's intentions, likes and opinions. Shen advises the ruler to keep his own counsel, hide his motivations and conceal his tracks in inaction, availing himself of an appearance of stupidity and insufficiency.

Said obscuration was to be achieved together with the use of Method (Fa). Not acting himself, he can avoid being manipulated.

Despite such injunctions, it is clear that the ruler's assignments would still be completely up to him.

Shen Dao (350 – c. 275 BC)

Shen Dao argued for Wu wei in a similar manner to Shen Buhai, saying

Shen Dao also espouses an impersonal administration in much the same sense as Shen Buhai, and in contrast with Shang Yang emphasizes the use of talent and the promotion of ministers, saying that order and chaos are "not the product of one man's efforts". Along this line, however, he challenges the Confucian and Mohist esteem and appointment of worthies as a basis of order, pointing out that talented ministers existed in every age.

Taking it upon himself to attempt a new, analytical solution, Shen advocated fairness as a new virtue, eschewing appointment by interview in favour of a mechanical distribution ("the basis of fairness") with the invariable Fa apportioning every person according to their achievement. Scholar Sugamoto Hirotsugu attributes the concept of Fen, or social resources, also used by the Guanzi and Xunzi, to Shen, given a "dimensional" difference through Fa, social relationships ("yin") and division.

The greatest function of Fa ("the principle of objective judgement") is the prevention of selfish deeds and argument. However, doubting its long-term viability Shen did not exclude moral values and accepted (qualified) Confucian Li's supplementation of Fa and social relationships, though he frames Li in terms of (impersonal) rules.

For this reason he is said to "laugh at men of worth" and "reject sages", his order relying not on them but on the Fa.

Linking Fa to the notion of impartial objectivity associated with universal interest, and reframing the language of the old ritual order to fit a universal, imperial and highly bureaucratized state, Shen cautions the ruler against relying on his own personal judgment, contrasting personal opinions with the merit of the objective standard, or fa, as preventing personal judgements or opinions from being exercised. Personal opinions destroy Fa, and Shen Dao's ruler therefore "does not show favouritism toward a single person".

Doctrine of position (shi)

Generally speaking, the "Fajia" understood that the power of the state resides in social and political institutions, and are innovative in their aim to subject the state to them. Like Shen Buhai, Shen Dao largely focused on statecraft (Fa), and Confucian Xun Kuang discusses him in this capacity, never referencing Shen Dao in relation to power. Shen Dao is remembered for his theories on shi (lit. "situational advantage", but also "power" or "charisma") because Han Fei references him in this capacity.

In the words of Han Fei, 

Used in many areas of Chinese thought, shi probably originated in the military field. Diplomats relied on concepts of situational advantage and opportunity, as well as secrecy (shu) long before the ascendancy of such concepts as sovereignty or law, and were used by kings wishing to free themselves from the aristocrats. Sun Tzu would go on to incorporate Taoist philosophy of inaction and impartiality, and Legalist punishment and rewards as systematic measures of organization, recalling Han Fei's concepts of power (shi) and tactics (shu).

Henry Kissinger's On China says: "Chinese statesmanship exhibits a tendency to view the entire strategic landscape as part of a single whole ... Strategy and statecraft become means of 'combative coexistence' with opponents. The goal is to manoeuvre them into weakness while building up one's own shi, or strategic position." Kissinger considers the "manoeuvring" approach an ideal, but one that ran in contrast to the conflicts of the Qin dynasty.

Shen Dao on shi
Searching out the causes of disorder, Shen Dao observed splits in the ruler's authority. Shen Dao's theory on power echoes Shen Buhai, referenced by Xun Kuang as its originator, who says "He who (can become) singular decision-maker can become the sovereign of All under Heaven." Shen Dao's theory may otherwise have been borrowed from the Book of Lord Shang, originating in Shang Yang and Shen Dao's abandonment of a singular Fa, or Standard, as correct.

For Shen Dao, "Power" ( shi) refers to the ability to compel compliance; it requires no support from the subjects, though it does not preclude this. (shi's) merit is that it prevents people from fighting each other; political authority is justified and essential on this basis. Shen Dao says: "When All under Heaven lacks the single esteemed [person], then there is no way to carry out the principles [of orderly government, li ]. ... Hence the Son of Heaven is established for the sake of All under Heaven ... All under Heaven is not established for the sake of the Son of Heaven ..."

Talent cannot be displayed without power. Shen Dao says: "The flying dragon rides on the clouds and the rising serpent wanders in the mists. But when the clouds disperse and the mists clear up, the dragon and the serpent become the same as the earthworm and the large winged black ant because they have lost what they ride." Leadership is not a function of ability or merit, but is given by some process, such as giving a leader to a group. "The ruler of a state is enthroned for the sake of the state; the state is not established for the sake of the prince. Officials are installed for the sake of their offices; offices are not established for the sake of officials ..."

While moral capability is usually disregarded by the Fajia, Shen Dao considers it useful in terms of authority. If the ruler is inferior but his command is practiced, it is because he is able to get support from people. But his ideas otherwise constitute a "direct challenge" to Confucian virtue. Virtue is unreliable because people have different capacities. Both morality together with intellectual capability are insufficient to rule, while position of authority is enough to attain influence and subdue the worthy, making virtue "not worth going after".

Han Fei on Shi
Like Shen Dao, Han Fei seems to admit that virtue or charisma can have persuasive power even in his own time. However, he considers virtue instrumental, and Wu-wei, or nonaction, as its essence. Furthermore, he criticizes virtue as insufficient; power should be amassed through "laws" (fa), and unlike Shen considers government by moral persuasion and government by power (shi) mutually incompatible. The ruler's authority (shi) should depend neither on his own personal qualities or cultivation, or even upon Shen Dao's position or power, but on Fa (law or checks and balances), a more vital source for his authority. Shang Yang and Han Fei's rejection of charisma (shi) as ineffective underwrite their rejection of the Confucian ruler. Han Fei does stress that the leader has to occupy a position of substantial power before he is able to use these or command followers. Competence or moral standing do not allow command.

For Han Fei, in order to actually influence, manipulate or control others in an organization and attain organizational goals it is necessary to utilize tactics (shu), regulation (fa), and rewards and punishment – the "two handles".Reward and punishment determine social positions – the right to appoint and dismiss. In line with Shi, these should never be relegated. The ruler must be the sole dispenser of honors and penalties. If these are delegated to the smallest degree, and people are appointed on the basis of reputation or worldly knowledge, then rivals will emerge and the ruler's power will fall to opinion and cliques (the ministers). Allowing him to prevent collapse by combating or resolving ministerial disagreements and ambitions, the rule's exclusive authority outweighs all other considerations, and Han Fei requires that the ruler punish disobedient ministers even if the results of their actions were successful. Goods may not be considered meaningful outside of his control.

Han Fei (280–233 BC)
Han Fei's theory is more interested in self-preservation than formulating any general theory of the state. Sinologist Daniel Bell considers Han Fei's work a "political handbook for power-hungry rulers... (arguing that) political leaders should act like rational sociopaths" with "total-state control" strengthened by rewards and punishments.

Nonetheless, Han Fei inheres to the tradition of Fa, or objective "public standards guiding performance"(Chad Hansen), sometimes stressing public proclamations with "measurement-like precision" linking performance with reward or punishment. Considering coherent discourse essential for the functioning of the state, Han Fei's analysis of the problem of rulership is that "people naturally incline to private interpretation" (Chad Hansen). Differentiating his theory from that of the Confucians through the objectivity and mass public accessibility of Fa, he considers measurement (Fa) the only justification for adopting an explicit code, rather than leaving matters to tradition and elite conceptions of virtue (de). As with Shen Buhai and most of the School of Names he takes the congruence between name and reality as a primary goal.

Public, measurement-like standards for applying names (administrative standards or job contracts) can "plausibly make it hard for clever ministers to lie, (or) for glib talkers to take people (or the ruler) in with sophistries ... [They make it possible to] correct the faults of superiors, expose error, check excess, and unify standards ... Laws, by themselves, cannot prevent the ruler from being fooled or deceived. The ruler needs Fa." Han Fei's arguments for "rule by law" (Fa) would not have as much persuasive power as they do if not for Fa, without which its objectives cannot be achieved. He rejects Confucian Li, scholarly interpretation and opinion, worldly knowledge, and reputation: models must be measured, dissolving behaviour and disputes of distinction into practical application.

Considering politics the only means of preserving the power of the state, he emphasizes standards (Fa), preventing disputes in language or knowledge, as the ruler's only protection. Providing reward and penalty automatically, Fa strictly defines state functions through binding, general rules, removing from discussion what would otherwise only be opinion, and preventing conflicts of competencies, undue powers or profits. To this end, Han Fei's high officials focus solely on definition through calculation and the construction of objective models, judged solely by effectiveness.

Wu wei
Devoting the entirety of Chapter 14, "How to Love the Ministers", to "persuading the ruler to be ruthless to his ministers", Han Fei's enlightened ruler strikes terror into his ministers by doing nothing (wu wei). The qualities of a ruler, his "mental power, moral excellence and physical prowess" are irrelevant. He discards his private reason and morality, and shows no personal feelings. What is important is his method of government. Fa (administrative standards) require no perfection on the part of the ruler.

Han Fei's use of Wu-Wei may have been derivative of Taoism, but its Tao emphasizes autocracy ("Tao does not identify with anything but itself, the ruler does not identify with the ministers"). Sinologists like Randall P. Peerenboom argue that Han Fei's Shu (technique) is arguably more of a "practical principle of political control" than any state of mind. Han Fei nonetheless begins by advising the ruler to remain "empty and still".

Han Fei's commentary on the Tao Te Ching asserts that perspectiveless knowledge – an absolute point of view – is possible, though the chapter may have been one of his earlier writings.

Performance and title (Xing-Ming)
Han Fei was notoriously focused on what he termed Xing-Ming or "name and punishment". Han-dynasty era Sima Qian and Liu Xiang defined Xing-Ming as "holding actual outcome accountable to Ming (speech)". In line with both the Confucian and Mohist rectification of names, it is relatable to the Confucian tradition in which a promise or undertaking, especially in relation to a government aim, entails punishmentor reward. However, the tight, centralized control emphasized by both Han Fei and that of his predecessor Shen Buhai's conflicts with the Confucian idea of the autonomous minister.

Possibly referring to the drafting and imposition of laws and standardized legal terms, Xing-Ming may originally have meant "punishments and names", but with the emphasis on the latter. It functions through binding declarations (Ming), like a legal contract. Verbally committing oneself, a candidate is allotted a job, indebting him to the ruler. "Naming" people to (objectively determined) positions, it rewards or punished according to the proposed job description and whether the results fit the task entrusted by their word, which a real minister fulfils.

Han Fei insists on the perfect congruence between words and deeds. Fitting the name is more important than results. The completion, achievement, or result of a job is its assumption of a fixed form (xing), which can then be used as a standard against the original claim (ming). A large claim but a small achievement is inappropriate to the original verbal undertaking, while a larger achievement takes credit by overstepping the bounds of office.

Han Fei's "brilliant ruler" "orders names to name themselves and affairs to settle themselves".

Assessing the accountability of his words to his deeds, the ruler attempts to "determine rewards and punishments in accordance with a subject's true merit" (using Fa). It is said that using names (ming) to demand realities (shi) exalts superiors and curbs inferiors, provides a check on the discharge of duties, and naturally results in emphasizing the high position of superiors, compelling subordinates to act in the manner of the latter.

Han Fei considers Xing-Ming an essential element of autocracy, saying that "In the way of assuming Oneness names are of first importance. When names are put in order, things become settled down; when they go awry, things become unfixed." He emphasizes that through this system, initially developed by Shen Buhai, uniformity of language could be developed, functions could be strictly defined to prevent conflict and corruption, and objective rules (Fa) impervious to divergent interpretation could be established, judged solely by their effectiveness. By narrowing down the options to exactly one, discussions on the "right way of government" could be eliminated. Whatever the situation (shi) brings is the correct Dao.

Though recommending use of Shen Buhai's techniques, Han Fei's Xing-Ming is both considerably narrower and more specific. The functional dichotomy implied in Han Fei's mechanistic accountability is not readily implied in Shen's, and might be said to be more in line with the later thought of the Han dynasty linguist Xu Gan than that of either Shen Buhai or his supposed teacher Xun Kuang.

The "Two Handles"

Though not entirely accurately, most Han works identify Shang Yang with penal law. Its discussion of bureaucratic control is simplistic, chiefly advocating punishment and reward. Shang Yang was largely unconcerned with the organization of the bureaucracy apart from this. The use of these "two handles" (punishment and reward) nonetheless forms a primary premise of Han Fei's administrative theory. However, he includes it under his theory of Shu in connection with Xing-Ming.

As a matter of illustration, if the "keeper of the hat" lays a robe on the sleeping Emperor, he has to be put to death for overstepping his office, while the "keeper of the robe" has to be put to death for failing to do his duty. The philosophy of the "Two Handles" likens the ruler to the tiger or leopard, which "overpowers other animals by its sharp teeth and claws"(rewards and punishments). Without them he is like any other man; his existence depends upon them. To "avoid any possibility of usurpation by his ministers", power and the "handles of the law" must "not be shared or divided", concentrating them in the ruler exclusively.

In practice, this means that the ruler must be isolated from his ministers. The elevation of ministers endangers the ruler, with which he must be kept strictly apart. Punishment confirms his sovereignty; law eliminates anyone who oversteps his boundary, regardless of intention. Law "aims at abolishing the selfish element in man and the maintenance of public order", making the people responsible for their actions.

Han Fei's rare appeal (among Legalists) to the use of scholars (law and method specialists) makes him comparable to the Confucians, in that sense. The ruler cannot inspect all officials himself, and must rely on the decentralized (but faithful) application of laws and methods (fa). Contrary to Shen Buhai and his own rhetoric, Han Fei insists that loyal ministers (like Guan Zhong, Shang Yang, and Wu Qi) exist, and upon their elevation with maximum authority. Though Fajia sought to enhance the power of the ruler, this scheme effectively neutralizes him, reducing his role to the maintenance of the system of reward and punishments, determined according to impartial methods and enacted by specialists expected to protect him through their usage thereof. Combining Shen Buhai's methods with Shang Yang's insurance mechanisms, Han Fei's ruler simply employs anyone offering their services.

Enlightened absolutism
Even if the Fajia were not ardent absolutists (and Han Fei believed that most rulers would be average), they would never dream of openly challenging absolutism, and its methods are presented as empowering the ruler. Han Fei's doctrine, however, challenges its absolutist premise out of its own mouth. In order for its administration to function, the ruler must act as a cog in its operation, and that alone. The operation of Fa implies non-interference not only in its application, but also in its development, determined through method.

Sinologist Xuezhi Guo contrasts the Confucian "Humane ruler" with the Legalists as "intending to create a truly 'enlightened ruler. He quotes Benjamin I. Schwartz as describing the features of a truly Legalist "enlightened ruler":

As easily as mediocre carpenters can draw circles by employing a compass, anyone can employ the system Han Fei envisions. The enlightened ruler restricts his desires and refrains from displays of personal ability or input in policy. Capability is not dismissed, but the ability to use talent will allow the ruler greater power if he can utilize others with the given expertise. Laws and regulations allow him to utilize his power to the utmost. Adhering unwaveringly to legal and institutional arrangements, the average monarch is numinous. A.C. Graham writes:

Resting empty, the ruler simply checks "shapes" against "names" and dispenses rewards and punishments accordingly, concretizing the Tao ("path") of Laozi into standards for right and wrong. Submerged by the system he supposedly runs, the alleged despot disappears from the scene.

Later history

Fall

Guided by Legalist thought, the First Qin Emperor Qin Shi Huang conquered and unified the China's warring states into thirty-six administrative provinces, under what is commonly thought of as the first Chinese empire, the Qin dynasty. The Qin document "On the Way of Being an Official" proclaims the ideal official as a responsive conduit, transmitting the facts of his locale to the court, and its orders, without interposing his own will or ideas. It charges the official to obey his superiors, limit his desires, and to build roads to smooth the transmitting of directives from the center without modification. It praises loyalty, absence of bias, deference, and the appraisal of facts.

The intrastate realpolitik would end up devouring the philosophers themselves. Holding that if punishments were heavy and the law equally applied, neither the powerful nor the weak would be able to escape consequences, Shang Yang advocated the state's right to punish even the ruler's tutor, and ran afoul of the future King Huiwen of Qin (–311 BC). Whereas at one point, Shang Yang had the power to exile his opponents (and, thus, eviscerate individual criticism) to border regions of the state, he was captured by a law he had introduced and died being torn into pieces by chariots. Similarly, Han Fei would end up being poisoned by his envious former classmate Li Si, who in turn would be killed (under the law he had introduced) by the aggressive and violent Second Qin Emperor that he had helped to take the throne.

As recorded in the Shiji and Book of Han, the Han dynasty took over the governmental institutions of the Qin dynasty almost unchanged, but in its early decades it was not a centralized state, parcelling out the country to a number of relatives, who as vassal kings who ruled with full authority. The reputation of Legalism suffered from its association with the former Qin dynasty. Sima Tan, though hailing the Fa "school" for "honouring rulers and derogating subjects, and clearly distinguishing offices so that no one can overstep [his responsibilities]", criticized the Legalist approach as "a one-time policy that could not be constantly applied". Though different philosophically, the pairing of figures like Shen Buhai and Shang Yang along with Han Fei became common in the early Han dynasty, Sima Tan glossing the three as Fa Jia and his son as adherents of "xing ming" ("performance and title").

The syncretic Han Dynasty text, the Huainanzi writes that

Usually referring to Warring States period philosophers, during the Han, others disliked by the Confucian orthodoxy would be grouped under the Fajia, like the otherwise Confucianistic reformers Guan Zhong and Xunzi, and the Huang-Lao Taoists.

Imperial China

Han dynasty
Despite the fall of the Qin dynasty, the administration and political theory developed during the formative Warring States period would still influence every dynasty thereafter, as well as the Confucian philosophy that underlay Chinese political and juridical institutions. The influence of the Fajia on Han Confucianism is very apparent, adopting Han Fei's emphasis of a supreme ruler and authoritarian system rather than Mencius's devaluation thereof, or Xun Kuang's emphasis on the Tao.

Shen Buhai's book appears to have been widely studied at the beginning of the Han era. As protégé of a Han Dynasty Commandant of Justice that had studied under Li Si, Jia Yi was a student of Shen Buhai through them. Jia describes Shen Buhai's Shu as a particular method of applying the Tao, or virtue, bringing together Confucian and Taoist discourses. He uses the imagery of the Zhuangzi of the knife and hatchet as examples of skillful technique in both virtue and force, saying "benevolence, righteousness, kindness and generosity are the ruler's sharp knife. Power, purchase, law and regulation are his axe and hatchet." His writings blame the fall of the Qin dynasty simply on the education of the second emperor. He would draw up elaborate plans for reorganizing the bureaucracy, which Emperor Wen of Han put into effect.

Shen Buhai never attempts to articulate natural or ethical foundations for his Fa (administrative method), nor does he provide any metaphysical grounds for his method of appointment (later termed "xing-ming"), but later texts do. The Huang-Lao work Boshu grounds fa and xing-ming in the Taoist Dao.

The Discourses on Salt and Irons Lord Grand Secretary uses Shang Yang in his argument against the dispersion of the people, stating that "a Sage cannot order things as he wishes in an age of anarchy". He recalls Lord Shang's chancellery as firm in establishing laws and creating orderly government and education, resulting in profit and victory in every battle. Although Confucianism was promoted by the new emperors, the government continued to be run by Legalists. Emperor Wu of Han (140–87 BC) barred Legalist scholars from official positions and established a university for the study of the Confucian classics, but his policies and his most trusted advisers were Legalist. Michael Loewe called the reign of Emperor Wu the "high point" of Modernist (classically justified Legalist) policies, looking back to "adapt ideas from the pre-Han period". An official ideology cloaking Legalist practice with Confucian rhetoric would endure throughout the imperial period, a tradition commonly described as wàirú nèifǎ.

It became commonplace to adapt Legalist theories to the Han state by justifying them using the classics, or combining them with the notion of the "way" or "pattern of the cosmos" ("The Way gave birth to law" Huangdi Sijing). Some scholars "mourn" the lack of pure examples of Taoism, Confucianism and Legalism in the Han dynasty more generally. Han sources would nonetheless come to "treat Legalism as an alternative to the methods of the Classicists". During the decay of the Han Dynasty, many scholars again took up an interest in Legalism, Taoism and even Mohism, and a number of Confucians took up "Legalist" methods to combat the growing disregard for law.

Xing-Ming influences
The Shiji records Li Si as repeatedly recommending "supervising and holding responsible", which he attributed to Shen Buhai. A stele set up by Qin Shi Huang memorializes him as a sage that, taking charge of the government, established Xing-Ming.

In the early Han dynasty, Sima Tan's Taoist syncretism almost unmistakably uses the same sort of technique as Shen Buhai, saying:

The Huang–Lao text Jing fa says

The Shiji states that Emperor Wen of Han was "basically fond of Xing-Ming". Jia Yi advised Wen to teach his heir to use Shen Buhai's method, so as to be able to "supervise the functions of the many officials and understand the usages of government". Pressure groups saw Jia Yi's dismissal, but was brought back to criticize the government. Two advisors to Wen's heir, Emperor Jing of Han were students of Xing-Ming, one passing the highest grade of examination, and admonished Jing for not using it on the feudal lords.

By the time of the civil service examination was put into place, Confucian influence saw outright discussion of Shen Buhai banned. Xing-Ming is not discussed by Imperial University's promoter, the famous Confucian Dong Zhongshu. However, the Emperor under which it was founded, Emperor Wu of Han, was both familiar with and favorable to Legalist ideas, and the civil service examination did not come into existence until its support by Gongsun Hong, who did write a book on Xing-Ming. The Emperor Xuan of Han was still said by Liu Xiang to have been fond of reading Shen Buhai, using Xing-Ming to control his subordinates and devoting much time to legal cases.

Regarded as being in opposition to Confucians, as early as the Eastern Han its full and original meaning would be forgotten. Yet the writings of Dong Zhongshu discuss personnel testing and control in a manner sometimes hardly distinguishable from the Han Feizi. Like Shen Buhai, he dissuades against reliance upon punishments. As Confucianism ascended the term disappeared, but appears again in later dynasties.

The Yongzheng Emperor of the Qing dynasty was also said to "xunming zishe", or "demand performance in accordance with title", a near-verbatim usage of the Han Feizi.

Post-Han
The Records of the Three Kingdoms describes Cao Cao as a hero who "devised and implemented strategies, lorded the world over, wielded skillfully the law and political technique of Shen Buhai and Shang Yang, and unified the ingenious strategies of Han Fei". Zhuge Liang also attached great importance to the works of Shen Buhai and Han Fei. The tendency toward Legalism is apparent in intellectual circles toward the end of the Han dynasty, and would be reinforced by Cao Wei. Dispossessed peasants were organized into paramilitary agricultural colonies to increase food production for the army, and penal legislation increased. These policies would be followed by the Northern Wei.

Emperor Wen of Sui is recorded as having withdrawn his favour from the Confucians, giving it to "the group advocating Xing-Ming and authoritarian government". But Wen might be said to have already been steeped in a Legalist tradition followed by the aristocratic institutions of the northern dynasties, who concerned themselves with functional organization and social hierarchy. The Sui dynasty and Tang dynasty were largely based upon the Western Wei and Northern Zhou, refining pre-existing institutions and taking measures against the aristocracy.

Quoting Arthur Wright, Author Hengy Chye Kiang calls the Sui dynasty a "strong autocratic power with a penchant for Legalist philosophy", and its prime minister Gao Jiong "a man of practical statecraft" recalling the great Legalist statesmen. His influence saw the replacement of Confucians with officials of "Legalist" outlook favoring centralization.

Under Legalist influence, Li Gou and Wang Anshi emphasised seeking profit for the people. Deng Guangming argued that Wang Anshi was influenced by Warring States-era Legalism, with his emphasis on "enriching the state and strengthening the army" and Legalist ideas of law. His baojia system which survived until the end of Imperial China has been described as a Legalist device.

Ming dynasty
Li Shanchang (1314–1390), a founding Prime Minister of the Ming dynasty, studied Chinese Legalism. It is said that Li was the Emperor Hongwu's closest comrade during the war, and greatest contributor to his ultimate victory and thus establishment of the Ming Dynasty. Deeply trusted by the Emperor, Hongwu consulted Li on institutional matters. Li planned the organization of the "six ministries" and shared in the drafting of a new law code. He established salt and tea monopolies based on Yuan institutions, eliminated corruption, restored minted currency, opened iron foundries, and instituted fish taxes. It is said that revenues were sufficient, yet the people were not oppressed. Most of his other activities seem to have supported Hongwu Emperor's firm control of his regime. Mainly responsible for ferreting out disloyalty and factionalism among military officers, he used a reward and punishment system reminiscent of the Han Feizi, and may have had a kind of secret police in his service. At times he had charge of all civil and military officials in Nanking.

In 1572 Zhang Juzheng, a legalistic, prime-minister like figure of the Ming Dynasty, had the young emperor of the time issue a warning edict against China's bureaucracy with the reference that they had abandoned the public interest for their own private interests. It reads: "From now on, you will be pure in your hearts and scrupulous in your work. You will not harbor private designs and deceive your sovereign ... You will not complicate debates and disconcert the government." It suggests that good government will prevail as long as top ministers were resolute in administration of the empire and minor officials were selflessly devoted to the public good. It is said that the officials became "very guarded and circumspect" following its release. His "On Equalizing Taxes and Succoring the People" postulated that the partiality of local officials toward powerful local interests was responsible for abuses in tax collection, hurting both the common people and the Ming state.

Zhang Juzheng wrote that "it is not difficult to erect laws, but it is difficult to see they are enforced". His Regulation for Evaluating Achievements (kao cheng fa) assigned time limits for following government directives and made officials responsible for any lapses, enabling Zhang to monitor bureaucratic efficiency and direct a more centralized administration. That the rules were not ignored are a testament to his basic success.

Modern influence

Qing decline and reform in the 19th-20th centuries
In the midst of the decline of the Qing dynasty in the late-19th century, Confucianism turned towards practicality (the School of Practical Statecraft, substantial learning). For some reformist scholars the focus on Confucianism was eroded in favour of Legalist principles of bian-fa (state reform), fu-qiang (state wealth and power) and even shang-zhan (economic warfare). Albert Feuerwerker argues that this Legalist raison d'etat ultimately was connected to the reform proposals of the 1890s, such as the Hundred Days Reform, and thence the New Policies of the early twentieth century. Western science was integrated into the Confucian worldview as an interpretation and application of Confucian principles. Shang Yang's slogan of "rich country, strong army" was also reinvoked in nineteenth century Japan as a "formal ideological foundation of industrial and technological development".

Legalism was partly rehabilitated in the twentieth century by new generations of intellectuals. One, Mai Menghua (1874–1915), promulgated interest in Shang Yang's thought, comparing Shang Yang's view of history with the evolutionary ideas of western theorists. The New Culture Movement leader, Hu Shi (1891–1962), hailed Han Fei and Li Si for their "brave spirit of opposing those who 'do not make the present into their teacher but learn from the past.

Republican era
Kuomintang leader Hu Hanmin (1879–1936) wrote the preface to a new edition of the Book of Lord Shang. Because the Fajia ignored differences among subjects, early twentieth century Chinese scholarship often viewed it within the context of Western "rule of law". One 1922 article, "The Antiquity of Chinese Law", attributes three legal theories to Han Fei, and referred to him as a "jurist". From the 1920s on it was viewed as being in a historical struggle with the Confucian "rule of men".

Maoist era
The early Mao Zedong has been described as a "dyed-in-the-wool" Legalist or "Lord Shang-style 'sage ruler', who defined the law according to revolutionary needs". Communist intellectuals used the Fajia in their criticism of Confucianism, describing the conflict between the two as class struggle. In 1950, the PRC combined law with campaigns against political enemies, and appeals to the Fajia for solutions became common after the Great Leap Forward. Fazhi, another historical term for "Legalism", would be used to refer to both socialist legality and Western rule of law. Still contrasted with renzhi (or rule of persons), most Chinese wanted to see it implemented in China.

Dengist era, contrasting east and west
In "Globalization and State Transformation in China" (2004), a work included in Cambridge's Asia-Pacific studies, Yongnian Zheng invokes Chinese Legalism as a modern basis in a contrasting of Chinese rule by law with the wests rule of law, although with a "buearacratic ethos" of modern Soviet influence in the 1970s.

Zheng references Richard Baum, differentiating China's rule by law as an instrument of state power, enabling the state to "rely on the gentry, family heads, and village elders to enforce local customs". This power was "transferred to the courts" in the more pluralistic west, and is contrasted as being intended to act as a delicately balanced "shield" against arbitrary state power. Sinologist Edward Epstein viewed law in China as still operating in the former vein, using rule by law to "uphold the socialist political order and perpetuate party domination."

However, although lacking rule of law proper, rule of law became a major subject and in the 3rd Plenary Session of the 11th Central Committee of the Chinese Communist Party in 1978, and subsequent major sociopolitical aim. The congress proposed the sixteen-word formula, "you fa ke yi, you fa bi yi, zha fa bi yan, we bi jiu", or "there must be laws (fa) for people to follow, these laws (fa) must be observed, their enforcement must be strict, and law-breakers must be dealt with." The development of the legal system, and the development of democracy, were considered almost interchangeable, with law systematizing and defending democracy. On this, Zheng quotes Deng Xiaoping: "Democracy has to be institutionalized and written into law so as to make sure that institutions and laws do not change whenever the leadership changes or whenever the leaders change their views."

Zheng considers the Chinese leadership of the 1980s and early 1990s to have "given the highest priority" to "building a legal system", and "vigorously pursuing" a "legal state" as a "new and effective way of governance". With efforts to establish rule of law after the mid 1990s, being set up as a goal in the 15th National Congress of the Chinese Communist Party, the growth of law might be said to outpace that of the Chinese economy.

Modern era
Two decades of reform, the Soviet Union's collapse and a financial crisis in the 1990s only served to increase the relevance of the rule of law, and the 1999 constitution was amended to "provide for the establishment of a socialist rule-of-law state", aimed at increasing professionalism in the justice system. Signs and flyers urged citizens to uphold the rule of law. In the following years, figures like Pan Wei, a prominent Beijing political scientist, would advocate for a consultative rule of law with a redefined role for the party and limited freedoms for speech, press, assembly and association.

Xingzhong Yu, Professor at Cornell University, describes the PRC through a framework of "State Legalism", and "Legalist" discourse is seeing a resurgence during the leadership of Xi Jinping, who is the General Secretary of the Chinese Communist Party, with journalists reporting on his fondness for the Chinese classics, alongside Confucianism, including Legalist writers and in particular Han Fei, both of which Xi sees as relevant. Han Fei gained new prominence with favourable citations. One sentence of Han Fei's that Xi quoted appeared thousands of times in official Chinese media at the local, provincial, and national levels. A key phrase of Xi's reforms is "govern the state according to law", although focusing on enforcing discipline on party and government officials first.

As Realists or Machiavellians
In 1939 Arthur Waley contrasted the Fajia as "Realists": the Realists, he says, largely ignored the individual, holding that the object of any society is to dominate other societies. In this vein, in his 1989 book "Disputers of the Tao" Angus Charles Graham titled his "Legalist" chapter "Legalism: an Amoral Science of Statecraft", sketching the fundamentals of an "amoral science" in Chinese thought largely based on the Han Feizi, consisting of "adapting institutions to changing situations and overruling precedent where necessary; concentrating power in the hands of the ruler; and, above all, maintaining control of the factious bureaucracy".

In 2003, Ross Terrill writes that "Chinese Legalism is as Western as Thomas Hobbes, as modern as Hu Jintao. It speaks the universal and timeless language of law and order. The past does not matter, state power is to be maximized, politics has nothing to do with morality, intellectual endeavour is suspect, violence is indispensable, and little is to be expected from the rank and file except an appreciation of force." He calls Legalism the "iron scaffolding of the Chinese Empire", but emphasizes the marriage between Legalism and Confucianism.

In 2005, Chinese law expert Randall Peerenboom compares Han Fei with the accepted standards of legal positivism, and concludes that he is a legal positivist. Establishing the ruler as the ultimate authority over the law, he also "shares the belief that morality and the law need not coincide".

In China the same year, Liang Zhiping theorized that law initially emerged in China as an instrument by which a single clan exercised control over rival clans. In the earlier Spring and Autumn period, a Qin king is recorded as having memorialized on punishment as a ritual function benefiting the people, saying, "I am the little son: respectfully, respectfully I obey and adhere to the shining virtuous power, brightly spread the clear punishments, gravely and reverentially perform my sacrifices to receive manifold blessings. I regulate and harmonize myriad people, gravely from early morning to evening, valorous, valorous, awesome, awesome – the myriad clans are truly disciplined! I completely shield the hundred nobles and the hereditary officers. Staunch, staunch in my civilizing and martial [power], I calm and silence those who do not come to the court [audience]. I mollify and order the hundred states to have them strictly serve the Qin."

The Fajia are often still compared in the west to Machiavellianism. The Oxford Handbook of World Philosophy paints the Legalists as Realists, stating that "What linked these men is that all were theorists or practitioners of a realistic amoral brand of statecraft aimed at consolidating and strengthening the power and wealth of the state and its autocratic ruler.  Their thought was realistic in being premised on what they took to be brute facts about how people actually behave ... It was amoral in that they were utterly unconcerned with whether the institutions and methods they advocated were morally justified."  Yuri Pines (2014) terms them as "political realists who sought to attain a 'rich state and a powerful army'(Shang Yang) and to ensure domestic stability."

Confucian argument
Sinologist Chad Hansen explains Confucius' famous argument in the Analects as largely directed against punishment. Punishment rather than education fails to develop social conformity through shame, which while gradual might be stabler and more effective in the long term. Official coercion strengthens self-interest. "Confucius repeatedly disparages the rise of litigiousness, glibness, and
cleverness" among people "governed by promulgated, public codes... formalized code can subjected to interpretive disputes", with "selfishness and glibness" threatening the natural social order. Confucians opposed the general accessibility of Fa as inviting mass "quibbling", with the notion that disputation should be restricted to the Confucian scholars as a task requiring Li (ritual) and Ren (humanity) and the development of intuition.

References

Sources and further reading
 
 Hansen, Chad. A Daoist Theory of Chinese Thought: A Philosophical Interpretation (2000)
 Hansen, Chad. Philosophy East & West. Jul94, Vol. 44 Issue 3. Fa (standards: laws) and meaning changes in Chinese philosophy
 Creel, Herrlee Glessner. What Is Taoism?: And Other Studies in Chinese Cultural History (1982)
 Creel, Herrlee Glessner. Shen Pu-hai: A Chinese Political Philosopher of the Fourth Century B.C. (1974)
 
 Garfield, Jay L.; Edelglass, William. The Oxford Handbook of World Philosophy. 2011
 
 Barbieri-Low, Anthony, trans. The Standard Measure of Shang Yang (344 B.C.) (2006)
 Duyvendak, J.J.L., trans. The Book of Lord Shang: A Classic of the Chinese School of Law. London: Probsthain, 1928.
 
  See also
 
 
 Graham, A.C., Disputers of the TAO: Philosophical Argument in Ancient China (Open Court 1993). 
 Harris, Eirik Lang, Legalism (Oxford Bibliographies Online) (Oxford University Press,  2018).  
 
 Qian, Sima. Records of the Grand Historian, Qin Dynasty. Translated by Burton Watson. New York: Columbia University Press, 1993.
 
  Various reprints.
 Watson, Burton, trans. Han Fei Tzu: Basic Writings. New York: Columbia University Press, 1964.
 Xinzhong, Yao, Introduction to Confucianism (2000). 
 Potter, Pittman, From Leninist Discipline to Socialist Legalism : Peng Zhen on Law and Political Authority in the PRC2 (2003).

External links

 Chad Hansen's Chinese Philosophy Pages
 "Chinese Legalism (In Our Time, 10/12/15)"
 The Han Feizi 
 Book of Lord Shang 
 The Shenzi

 
Chinese law
Theories of law
Politics of China
Political theories
Schools and traditions in ancient Chinese philosophy
Anti-Confucianism